Dance of Time is a 2017 studio album by Brazilian jazz musician Eliane Elias. The album was recorded in Brazil and released on March 24, 2017 via Concord Records. This is her 25th album as a leader. Dance of Time received the Latin Grammy for Best Latin Jazz Album at the 18th Annual Latin Grammy Awards.

Background
Guest musicians include pianist Amilton Godoy, Brazilian guitarists João Bosco and Toquinho, trumpeter Randy Brecker, vibraphonist Mike Mainieri, and singer Mark Kibble. The album celebrates the samba, a genre originating in Bahia via Africa as the last year marked the 100th anniversary of "Pelo Telefone", the first recorded samba track. Eliane's style of samba greatly borrows from choro, a tango influenced, slower type of samba that emerged in the 1930s. The album contains skillfully arranged classic tracks and contemporary samba compositions.

Reception
Peter Jones of London Jazz News noted, "As smooth as a smoothie made of liquid silk, singer and pianist Eliane Elias has spent the last three decades flying the flag for the kind of Brazilian music that first became internationally popular in the late 1950s. But far from being a mere nostalgist, she keeps it alive and kicking with her bold, contemporary arrangements... On this new album she focuses on the samba, with a side order of bossa nova. But what makes it the best collection of hers that I've ever heard (and I must admit, I haven't heard all 23 albums) is the inclusion of some astoundingly good sidemen."

John Fordham of The Guardian wrote, "As a vocalist, the Brazilian Eliane Elias radiates as much starry smooth-jazzy hipness as Diana Krall, but as an improvising pianist she's in a different league: a wellspring of polished bebop lines and skittish flourishes... Elias's trumpeter ex-husband Randy Brecker and Steps Ahead vibraphone partner Mike Mainieri are in the lineup, and the songs embrace jazz standards, Brazilian classics and poignant originals such as the dreamy Little Paradise." Dance of Time received the Latin Grammy for Best Latin Jazz Album and was nominated for Best Engineered Album at the 18th Annual Latin Grammy Awards.

Track listing

Personnel

Band
 Eliane Elias – piano, vocals, producer
 Randy Brecker – flugelhorn
 Amilton Godoy – piano
 Mike Mainieri – vibraphone
 João Bosco – guitar, vocals
 Conrado Goys – electric guitar
 Marcus Teixeira – acoustic guitar
 Toquinho – guitar, vocals
 Marcelo Mariano – bass guitar
 Celso de Almeida – drums
 Edú Ribeiro – drums
 Gustavo Di Dalva – percussion
 Marivaldo Dos Santos – percussion
 Mark Kibble – background vocals

Production
Paul Blakemore – mastering
Rodrigo de Castro Lopes – engineer
Chris Dunn – A&R
Mary Hogan – A&R
Marc Johnson – producer
Pete Karam – mixing
Bryan Pugh – vocal engineer
Steve Rodby – producer
Philppe Salomon – photography
Carrie Smith – package design
Bob Wolfenson – photography

References

External links
 Official site

2017 albums
Eliane Elias albums
Latin Grammy Award for Best Latin Jazz Album